Century High School (CHS) is a public high school located in Bismarck, North Dakota. It serves 1,346 students and is part of the Bismarck Public Schools system. The principal is Steve Madler. The school colors are red, white, and blue. Century's mascot is the Patriot.

The school was built on reclaimed land from Bismarck's landfill in 1976 and was renovated and expanded in 1998. It is one of three public high schools in the city of Bismarck. Century serves the northwest region of the city. It supports many extracurricular activities. Among these are several sports teams, pre-professional organizations, string orchestras, bands, and choirs.

Athletics

Championships

State Class 'A' boys' basketball: 1984, 2011, 2018
State Class 'A' baseball: 2018, 2019
State Class 'A' girls' basketball: 1990, 2009, 2012, 2013
State Class 'A' wrestling: 1987, 1988, 1990, 1994, 1995, 2001
State Class 'A' girls' track and field: 1999, 2005, 2011, 2012, 2013
State Class 'A' volleyball: 1983, 2008, 2012, 2015
State girls' swimming and diving: 1993 2009, 2010
State boys' swimming and diving: 2013, 2014, 2015, 2016
State girls' soccer: 1998, 2001, 2002, 2003, 2007, 2011
State boys' soccer: 2007, 2011, 2012, 2013
State boys' golf: 1978, 2013
State boys' football: 2015, 2016, 2019, 2020
State boys' track and field: 2015, 2016, 2018, 2019, 2020
State boys' cross country: 2016, 2017, 2019
State girls' cross country: 2014

Honors
The school's literary magazine is the Lit Mag, the newspaper is the Century Star, and the yearbook is  the Century Spirit. These student-run publications have all been recognized by the National Scholastic Press Association as being among the top scholastic publications in the country.

In 2008 Century's chamber orchestra was selected to perform at the national convention of the American String Teachers' Association in Albuquerque, New Mexico.

Notable alumni
Paula Broadwell – author and extramarital partner of David Petraeus
Cara Mund – Miss America 2018
Carmen Berg – Playboy Playmate July 1987
Todd Schmitz – swimming coach 
Carson Wentz – quarterback who is a free agent

Notes

External links
Century High School website

Public high schools in North Dakota
Buildings and structures in Bismarck, North Dakota
North Dakota High School Activities Association (Class A)
North Dakota High School Activities Association (Class AAA Football)
Schools in Burleigh County, North Dakota
Educational institutions established in 1976
1976 establishments in North Dakota